Gweilo: Memoirs of a Hong Kong Childhood is an autobiography by author Martin Booth. It was published in 2004 shortly before he died.

The book discusses the author's childhood in Hong Kong. The term "gweilo" literally means "ghost man" in Cantonese, but has been applied as a racial epithet for Caucasians (as in white ghosts). The book is rich with vivid descriptions of the author's explorations of Kowloon and Hong Kong, his learning of Cantonese and his numerous interactions with Chinese people in Hong Kong. In the United States, the book was marketed under the title Golden Boy.

The book appeared in the Reader's Digest Condensed Books series.

References

Notes

2004 non-fiction books
Travel autobiographies
British travel books
English non-fiction books
British autobiographies